This is a list of the Monitor Latino number-one songs of 2011. Chart rankings are based on airplay across radio states in Mexico utilizing the Radio Tracking Data, LLC in real time. Charts are ranked from Monday to Sunday. Besides the General chart, Monitor Latino published "Pop", "Regional Mexican" and "Anglo" charts.

Chart history

General
In 2011, fourteen songs reached number one on the General chart. Of these, thirteen songs were entirely in Spanish, and only one was in English. Ten acts achieved their first number-one song in Mexico: Gloria Trevi, Alejandra Guzmán, La Adictiva Banda San José de Mesillas, Los Tigres del Norte, Reyli, Yuridia, Calibre 50, Maroon 5, Christina Aguilera and Jenni Rivera.

"Golpes en el corazón" by Los Tigres del Norte & Paulina Rubio was the longest-running General number-one of the year, staying at the top position for sixteen consecutive weeks, which remains the longest number of weeks that a song has stayed at #1 since the General chart was founded in 2007. "Golpes en el corazón" was also the best-performing song of the year in Mexico according to Monitor Latino's Annual chart for 2011.

"Moves like Jagger" by Maroon 5 ft. Christina Aguilera was the first English-language song to reach #1 since the General chart was first published in 2007.

Pop

Regional

English

See also
List of Top 20 songs for 2011 in Mexico
List of number-one albums of 2011 (Mexico)

Notes

References

2011
Number-one songs
Mexico